Javanese sacred places are locations on the Island of Java, Indonesia that have significance from either village level through to national level as sacred, and in most cases deserve visitation--usually within the context of ziarah regardless of the ethnicity or religion of the visitor. The dominant form for many places is a sacred grave, or a place associated with persons considered to have special attributes in the past--like Wali Sanga or Royalty.

Form
The tendency has been for graves to equate to sacred places, but the full range can include (and this list is not exhaustive)

 Caves (Goa or Gua)
 Trees, or a group of trees (Pohon or Hutan)
 Springs
 Rock Outcrops 
 Remains of old buildings/structures
 Man made fixed structures - buildings, and ruins
 Kraton structures are considered sacred
 Places of rest of Javanese saints or legendary characters 

In some areas in Java, the tell-tale sign that a place has been ascribed sacred or special, is either traces of burnt incense (kemenyan) or flower petals.

Terminology
Common expressions in Javanese and Indonesian for these places are:
Pundhen short for pepundhen
Tempat Keramat
Tempat Ziarah

Other terms that might be used 

petilasan - traces - of ancestors.

Although there is no necessary set pattern, and each individuals pilgrimage is a very personal one, even if travelling with a group--there can be a roughly three tiered hierarchy of Javanese Sacred Places.

National
The graves of national and regional heroes and significant people--either of distant historic nature (the graves of the Wali Sanga or Islamic Saints of Java), or of more recent dates--national heroes of the last 100 years or so, and leaders and 'special people'.

Some examples:
 Borobudur, 9th century Mahayana Buddhist Temple, a powerful symbol for Indonesia to testify for its past greatness
 Prambanan, 8th-century Hindu temple
 Menang, in Pagu sub-district of Kediri Regency, dedicated to King Jayabaya of Kediri
 Mount Tidar in Magelang
 Ratu Boko
 The graves of the Wali, Sunan Kalijaga 
 The grave of Sultan Agung at Imogiri
 The grave of Sukarno in Blitar
 National Heroes cemetery in Kalibata, Jakarta

Regional
The graves and sites related to regionally significant figures who might be ethnically or regionally specific, rather than of national significance.

 Graves of local officials
 Graves of local families related to the Palaces, such as Yogyakarta, Surakarta

Local
The graves relating specifically to an individual--one's parents' graves, or grandparents' graves. Also sites within the localities of one's birth, or the graves of one's parents.

Natural sites - such as trees, rock outcrops, and springs carry significant folklore, some of which is collected and published.

The Networks
Considering the population of Java, and the potential to have a wide variation of the significances and networks of places that might be important to an individual, it is possible to think of Java as having a vast network of places that are situated within a complex array of visitations at the time of Idul Fitri that sees roads blocked by eager pilgrims clogging the transport networks of Java.

See also

 Candi of Indonesia
 Hinduism in Java
 Kejawèn
 Pilgrimage
 List of Sacred Places in Java
 Ziarah

References
 Roxas-Lim, A (1983) Caves and Bathing places as evidence of cultural accommodation Asian Studies (Manila) 21. pp.107-144

Javanese culture